FlatOut is a series of action demolition derby/racing video games created by Finnish independent video game developer Bugbear Entertainment. The FlatOut series has sold a total of almost 3 million units worldwide. After Bugbear developed FlatOut: Head On, Dutch video game developer Team6 Game Studios developed the next three games in the series, which are the Windows-exclusive FlatOut 3 and two spin-offs on Wii and Android. Kylotonn developed the series' fourth installment, FlatOut 4: Total Insanity, which was released on March 17, 2017 for PlayStation 4 and Xbox One in Europe and May 2 in the U.S.

The series has received both critical acclaim and notable negative reception with most notably FlatOut 3: Chaos & Destruction being considered one of the worst video games of all time and FlatOut 2 being considered the best in the series. It was called a welcome addendum to the derby-racing genre at first but eventually died out due to a lack of critical reception.

In September 2022, the new coming game-developing team called GOOD BOYS developed an indie demolition derby and racing game called TRAIL OUT, which is basically a FlatOut parody game with the story mode and different references from other games and media, and differently impressive game modes. TRAIL OUT soon received a mostly positive reception compared to BugBear's FlatOut games.

Games 

FlatOuts gameplay style remained mostly consistent over the years, so much so that it was criticized for being stagnant and repetitive. The first game featured standard lap races and destruction derby competitions against 7 computer-controlled opponents in either open environments or stadium laps. It was notable for featuring excessive car damage, silly physics and fun gameplay and FlatOut 2 was praised for evolving the gameplay of the first game and having better races, vehicles, graphics and controls. It received an enhanced version on Xbox 360 called FlatOut: Ultimate Carnage, which also received a port to the PlayStation Portable called FlatOut: Head On.

After FlatOut 2, the developers behind the series, Bugbear Entertainment, left the series and Dutch Team6 Game Studios took over the franchise for the next three entries and Kylotonn developed FlatOut 4: Total Insanity, the latest game in the series. However, future games didn't exceed FlatOut 2s critical reception, with FlatOut 3: Chaos & Destruction being considered one of the worst games ever made, FlatOut for the Wii being considered awful by Nintendo Gamer and FlatOut 4: Total Insanity receiving middling reviews. An iOS rag doll spin-off titled FlatOut Stuntman was developed and published by Team6 Game Studios in 2013.

References 

 
Nacon franchises
Video game franchises introduced in 2005